The Western Hotel, also known as the Pin Oak Tavern, is a historic building located southeast of Holy Cross, Iowa, United States.  John H. Floyd settled in Dubuque County in the early 1830s.  He was appointed postmaster in the 1840s, and he had this building built for his home and as the Pin Oak Post Office.  It is a rare example of a frame saltbox-style building in Iowa.  Its foundation is of undressed native limestone.  The house was located along a popular route to and from the city of Dubuque and it became known as hospitable place for good food, drink, and rest.  It was called the Western Hotel for a time because they had acquired a sign from a same-named place in Dubuque.  The building was listed on the National Register of Historic Places in 1976.

References

Houses completed in 1850
Buildings and structures in Dubuque County, Iowa
National Register of Historic Places in Dubuque County, Iowa
Houses on the National Register of Historic Places in Iowa
Saltbox architecture in Iowa